Ahmad ibn Ali (flourished mid-14th century) was the son of Jamal ad-Din I. The Emperor of Ethiopia Newaya Krestos made him Governor of Ifat after his father Ali ibn Sabr ad-Din unsuccessfully revolted against the Emperor and was put into prison.

Reign
His father Ali was released from imprisonment after eight years and restored to the governorship, whereupon he treated Ahmad as a traitor, excluding him from all positions of authority. Ahmad called on the intervention of Emperor Newaya Krestos to gain a position over a single district; and his sons were considered outcasts by the rest of the Walashma family.

See also
Walashma dynasty

Notes

Sultans of Ifat
14th-century monarchs in Africa
14th-century Somalian people